The Super Retro Trio is a video game console clone manufactured by Retro-Bit. It is able to play NES, Super NES, and Genesis cartridges, and an optional adapter for the console is available which allows it to play Game Boy and Game Boy Advance games.

Development
The console was announced on February 4, 2014. The system was released later that year, and followed by an improved model in 2018.

Reception
PC World reviewer Will Greenwald praised the console's compatibility both in the range of console games it supports and in its ability to replicate the console hardware; however, he did note that the console seemed "flimsy" and that it does not support HDMI or scale to higher resolutions.

References

Video game consoles
Backward-compatible video game consoles